Johann Adam Breunig (1660 in Mainz – 1727) was a German Baroque architect. 
After the Nine Years' War, the Elector Johann Wilhelm initiated the reconstruction of Heidelberg giving Breuning and other architects a broad field of activity. 

In 18th century Heidelberg, he built the Old Aula of the University, the Jesuit church, the Jesuit high school and some mansions for affluent citizens.

1660 births
1727 deaths
18th-century German architects
People from Heidelberg
German Baroque architects